Lake Park is a town in Palm Beach County, Florida, United States. The population was 8,155 at the 2010 census. As of 2018, the population recorded by the U.S. Census Bureau was 8,605. Lake Park is part of the Miami Metropolitan Area

Geography

Lake Park is located at  (26.800389, –80.064237).

History

Kelsey City, now known as Lake Park, was the first zoned municipality in the State of Florida. It was designed and planned by Dr. John Nolan of Boston, Massachusetts, and the Olmsted Brothers, the landscaping firm of Frederick Law Olmsted's sons, Frederick Jr and John Charles. The Lake Park Town Hall, constructed in 1927 and listed on the National Register of Historic Places, survived the 1928 Okeechobee hurricane and served as a shelter for town residents during the storm.

Demographics

2020 census

As of the 2020 United States census, there were 9,047 people, 2,580 households, and 1,699 families residing in the town.

2000 census

As of the census of 2000, there were 8,721 people, 3,346 households, and 2,024 families residing in the town. The racial makeup of the town was 41.26% White (38% were Non-Hispanic White,) 48.80% African American, 0.34% Native American, 2.89% Asian, 1.27% from other races, and 5.44% from two or more races. Hispanic or Latino of any race were 5.80% of the population.

There were 3,346 households, out of which 31.0% had children under the age of 18 living with them, 37.1% were married couples living together, 16.7% had a female householder with no husband present, and 39.5% were non-families. 29.3% of all households were made up of individuals, and 9.0% had someone living alone who was 65 years of age or older. The average household size was 2.58 and the average family size was 3.28.

In the town, the population was spread out, with 26.6% under the age of 18, 9.4% from 18 to 24, 32.8% from 25 to 44, 18.5% from 45 to 64, and 12.8% who were 65 years of age or older. The median age was 34 years. For every 100 females, there were 96.3 males. For every 100 females age 18 and over, there were 95.1 males.

The median income for a household in the town was $33,983, and the median income for a family was $37,047. Males had a median income of $26,476 versus $23,518 for females. The per capita income for the town was $18,212. About 12.5% of families and 16.8% of the population were below the poverty line, including 28.8% of those under age 18 and 12.3% of those age 65 or over.

As of 2000, speakers of English as a first language accounted for 76.01% of all residents, while French Creole made up 13.11%, Spanish was at 5.83%, French consisted of 2.35%, Vietnamese made up 1.34%, and Chinese as a mother tongue made up 0.59% of the population.

As of 2000, Lake Park had the sixth highest percentage of Haitian residents in the US, with 14.50% of the populace. It also had the nineteenth highest percentage of Jamaican residents in the US, at 5.80% of the town's population (tied with the Carol City section of Miami Gardens.)

Libraries 

The Lake Park Library is a public library at 529 Park Avenue, Lake Park, FL 33403. It was founded by the Lake Park Woman's Club in 1962, and it was established on the Town Hall's second floor.  Ownership of the library was transferred from the Woman's Club to the town, and it was relocated in 1969 to a new building next door, where it currently resides. The growing population and book collection led to the creation of a meeting room and a separate children's room by 1990. Thereafter, rapid transformations in the library's services and the diversification of library materials led to expanding the building from December 1999 to October 2000.

The library provides a variety of services and events including storytimes for children, homework assistance, programs for adults, public computers with internet access, and access to two study rooms.

References

External links
Town of Lake Park Official website
Lake Park Marina Official website

Towns in Palm Beach County, Florida
Towns in Florida
Populated places on the Intracoastal Waterway in Florida